Merlin Abdoulaye Tandjigora (born 6 April 1990) is a Gabonese professional footballer who plays as a central midfielder for S.C. Vila Real.

Career
Born in Port-Gentil, Tandjigora was a player of the national football school located in his hometown. On 9 July 2010, he became the first player from the academy to sign a professional contract with a European club after signing a one-year contract with Metz.

Tandjigora arrived at Metz in 2009 and joined the club's Championnat de France amateur 2 team for the 2009–10 season. He played in 21 matches and scored two goals as the reserve team of Metz were crowned champions of the league finishing with 107 points. After the season, Tandjigora signed his first professional contract and was, subsequently, promoted to the senior team and assigned the number 12 shirt by new manager Dominique Bijotat. He made his professional debut on 30 July 2010 in a Coupe de la Ligue match against Clermont. Tandjigora started the match and played 76 minutes in a 3–1 defeat. He made his league debut a week later in a 2–0 defeat to Évian.

Tandjigora was formerly a Gabonese youth international having earned caps with the nation's under-20 team in qualification for the 2009 African Youth Championship. On 30 September 2010, he was called up to the senior team for the first time by coach Gernot Rohr for matches against Oman and Saudi Arabia.  He competed for Gabon at the 2012 Summer Olympics.

On 13 December 2019 it was confirmed, that Tandjigore had joined S.C. Vila Real.

Honours

Club
Stade Mandji
 Gabon Championnat National D1: 2009

References

External links
 Merlin Tandjigora profile at fcmetz.com
 
 
 
 
 

1990 births
Living people
People from Ogooué-Maritime Province
Association football midfielders
Gabonese footballers
Gabonese expatriate footballers
Ligue 2 players
Liga Portugal 2 players
China League One players
Primeira Liga players
Championnat National players
Championnat National 2 players
AS Stade Mandji players
FC Metz players
USJA Carquefou players
FC Istres players
Leixões S.C. players
Meizhou Hakka F.C. players
C.F. Os Belenenses players
Belenenses SAD players
S.C. Vila Real players
Olympic footballers of Gabon
Footballers at the 2012 Summer Olympics
2017 Africa Cup of Nations players
Expatriate footballers in France
Expatriate footballers in Portugal
Expatriate footballers in China
Gabonese expatriate sportspeople in France
Gabonese expatriate sportspeople in Portugal
Gabonese expatriate sportspeople in China
Gabon international footballers
21st-century Gabonese people